Hoover Hynniewta is an Indian politician. He was elected to the Lok Sabha, the lower house of the Indian Parliament, from Autonomous District constituency in Assam as an Independent.

References

Lok Sabha members from Assam
India MPs 1957–1962
Possibly living people
Year of birth missing (living people)